The Rajwal is a Rajput clan found mainly in the Indian states of Himachal Pradesh and Jammu and Kashmir , districts of Punjab like pathankot . Their immediate ancestor was King Raja Abta Deo of Jammu, who founded a principality in Sialkot. They are a Dogra sub-group, and their customs are similar to other Dogras Rajputs . Rajwal Rajputs are Suryavanshi Linage Rajputs of Jammu and Kashmir. The Rajwal Rajputs intermarry with the Sulehria, Langeh, Andotra, Bhalwal, Baghal, lalotra, Manhas, Rana, Parihar, Jamwal, Rathore, Sambyal, Charak and Jaj.

Maharani Rani Rakwal 
Maharani Rani Rakwal was the first wife of Maharajah Gulab Singh. Maharani Rani Rakwal was mother of Maharajah Ranbir Singh of Jammu and Kashmir.

References 

Sialkot
Rajput clans of Himachal Pradesh
Rajput rulers
Dogra
Jammu and Kashmir politicians